Borislav Georgiev Dimitrov (11 November 1951 – 28 March 2013), commonly known as Boko Dimitrov, was a Bulgarian footballer who played as a defender. He made 31 appearances for the Bulgarian national team.

Career
Dimitrov made his debut for Bulgaria on 25 September 1974 in a friendly match against Romania, which finished as a 0–0 draw. He went on to make 31 appearances, scoring 2 goals, before making his last appearance on 14 April 1982 in a friendly match against Romania, which finished as a 1–2 loss.

Career statistics

International

International goals

Honours
Lokomotiv Sofia
Bulgarian League: 1977–78

References

External links
 
 
 

1951 births
2013 deaths
Bulgarian footballers
Bulgaria international footballers
PFC Rodopa Smolyan players
FC Lokomotiv 1929 Sofia players
Iraklis Thessaloniki F.C. players
First Professional Football League (Bulgaria) players
Super League Greece players
Bulgarian expatriate footballers
Bulgarian expatriate sportspeople in Greece
Expatriate footballers in Greece
Association football defenders